The Desmostylia (from Greek δεσμά desma, "bundle", and στῦλος stylos, "pillar") are an extinct order of aquatic mammals that existed from the early Oligocene (Rupelian) to the late Miocene (Tortonian).

Desmostylians are the only known extinct order of marine mammals.

The Desmostylia, together with Sirenia and Proboscidea (and possibly Embrithopoda), have traditionally been assigned to the afrotherian clade Tethytheria, a group named after the paleoocean Tethys around which they originally evolved. The relationship between the Desmostylia and the other orders within the Tethytheria has been disputed; if the common ancestor of all tethytheres was semiaquatic, the Proboscidea became secondarily terrestrial; alternatively, the Desmostylia and Sirenia could have evolved independently into aquatic mammals. The assignment of Desmostylia to Afrotheria has always been problematic from a biogeographic standpoint, given that Africa was the locus of the early evolution of the Afrotheria while the Desmostylia have only been found along the Pacific Rim. That assignment has been seriously undermined by a 2014 cladistic analysis that places anthracobunids and desmostylians, two major groups of putative non-African afrotheres, close to each other within the laurasiatherian order Perissodactyla. However, a subsequent study shows that, while anthracobunids are definite perissodactyls, desmostylians share the same number of characteristics necessary for either Paenungulata or Perissodactyla, making their former assessment as afrotheres a possibility.

Description

Desmostylians were large, fully aquatic quadrupeds with massive limbs and short tails. The smallest is Ashoroa laticosta, a relatively large animal at a body length of 168 cm, while the largest species reached sizes comparable to  Steller's sea cow.

A desmostylian skull has an elongated and broadened rostrum, with the nasal opening located slightly dorsally. The zygomatic arches are prominent (behind the eyes), the paroccipital processes elongated (downward-pointing processes behind the jaw-joints), and the epitympanic sinuses open into the temporal fossae (cavities above the ear holes).

The mandible and maxilla typically have forward-pointing incisors and canine tusks, followed by a long postcanine diastema, partly because of the reduced number of premolars. The cusps of the premolars and molars are composed of densely packed cylinders of thick enamel, giving the order its name ("bundle of columns"). The primitive dental formula is 3.1.4.3, with a trilobate fourth deciduous premolar. The cheek teeth are brachydont and bunodont in primitive genera, but hypsodont in later genera such as Desmostylus, which has many supernumerary cusps.

In the postcrania, the clavicle is absent and the sternum consists of a series of heavy, paired, plate-like sternebrae. In adults, the joints between the radius and ulna prevent any movements. The metacarpals are longer than metatarsals, and each foot has four digits (digit I is vestigial).

Behaviour
Their dental and skeletal forms suggest that desmostylians were aquatic herbivores dependent on littoral habitats. Their name refers to their highly distinctive molars, in which each cusp was modified into hollow columns, so a typical molar would have resembled a cluster of pipes, or in the case of worn molars, volcanoes. (This may reflect the close relationship between the Paenungulata, to which this group has been assigned, and the Tubulidentata.)

Desmostylus did not chew or eat like any other known animal.  It clenched its teeth, rooted up plants with the help of tusks and powerful neck, and then sucked them in using strong throat muscles and the shape of the roof of the mouth.

Desmostylians are believed to be aquatic because of a combination of characteristics. Their legs seemed to be adapted for terrestrial locomotion, while a number of other parameters confirms their aquatic nature:
 Fossils have been found in marine strata.
 The nares are retracted and the orbits are raised like in other aquatic mammals.
 Levels of stable isotopes in their tooth enamel suggest an aquatic diet and environment (carbon and oxygen) and fresh or brackish water (strontium).
 Their spongy bone structure is similar to that of cetaceans.

Based on a comparison of trunk and limb proportions,  concluded that desmostylians were more terrestrial than aquatic and clearly fore limb-dominated swimmers, hence they were more similar to "sea bears" than "sea sloths" (as proposed by other researchers.) However, a more recent and detailed analysis of desmostylian bone structure has revealed them to be fully aquatic, like sirenians and cetaceans, with their limbs being incapable of supporting their own weight on land. More recent studies vindicate this assessment, as desmostylians had a thoracic morphology more similar to sirenians and modern cetaceans than to that of semiaquatic mammals. Its less dense bone structure suggests that Desmostylus had a lifestyle of active swimming and possibly feeding at the surface, while other desmostylians were primarily slow swimmers and/or bottom walkers and sea grass feeders.

Habitat
A 2017 study on Desmostylus and Paleoparadoxia shows that the former preferred areas shallower than 30 m, while the latter occurred in deep, offshore waters.

Distribution
Desmostylian fossils are known from the northern Pacific Rim, from southern Japan through Russia, the Aleutian Islands, and the Pacific coast of North America to the southern tip of Baja California. They range from the Early Oligocene to the late Miocene.

Extinction
Desmostylians, being fully marine herbivores, are thought to have been outcompeted ecologically by dugongid sirenians. In particular, later species like Neoparadoxia are more specialised than previous forms, suggesting increased divergence to compete with sirenians, and sirenian diversity appears to increase with desmostylian decline. Both desmostylians and North Pacific dugongids were apparently kelp specialists, as opposed to marine herbivorous mammals from other regions, with diets primarily composed of seagrass.

Classification

One of the most comprehensive collections of desmostylian teeth was amassed by paleontologist John C. Merriam, who concluded on the basis of the molar structure and repeated occurrence in marine beds that the animals had been aquatic, and were probably sirenian.

In 1926, the Austrian palaeontologist Othenio Abel suggested origins with monotremes, like the duck-billed platypus, and in 1933, he even created the order "Desmostyloidea", which he placed within the Multituberculata. Abel died shortly after World War II, and his classification won few supporters and has been ignored since.

Because desmostylians were originally known only from skull fragments, teeth, and bits of other bones, general agreement was that they had had flippers and a fin-like tail.

A major find was announced in October 2015 after scientists examined an extensive group of giant, tusked, quadruped, marine mammal fossils. This northernmost to date species discovery had been unearthed during excavation for the construction of a school in Unalaska, in the Aleutian Islands. A rendition of a group was drawn by Alaskan artist Ray Troll.

Despite their similarities to manatees and elephants, desmostylians were entirely unlike any living creatures. Douglas Emlong's 1971 discovery of the new genus Behemotops from Oregon showed that early desmostylians had more proboscidean-like teeth and jaws than later ones. Despite this discovery, their relationships to manatees and proboscids remain unresolved. The analysis of Cooper et al. (2014) indicates the similarities with manatees and elephants may be a result of convergence and that they may instead be basal perissodactyls.

 proposed a new classification of Paleoparadoxiidae:
 Order Desmostylia Reinhart, 1953
 Family Paleoparadoxiidae Reinhart, 1959
 Subfamily Behemotopsinae (Inuzuka, 1987)
 Behemotops Domning, Ray, and McKenna, 1986
 Behemotops proteus Domning, Ray, and McKenna, 1986 (including Behemotops emlongi Domning, Ray, and McKenna, 1986)
 Behemotops katsuiei Inuzuka, 2000b
 Subfamily Paleoparadoxiinae (Reinhart, 1959)
 Archaeoparadoxia
 Archaeoparadoxia weltoni (Clark, 1991)
 Paleoparadoxia Reinhart, 1959
 Paleoparadoxia tabatai (Tokunaga, 1939), (= Paleoparadoxia media Inuzuka, 2005)
 Neoparadoxia Barnes 2013
 Neoparadoxia repenningi (Domning and Barnes, 2007)
 Neoparadoxia cecilialina Barnes 2013

References

Further reading

External links

 

 
Tortonian extinctions
Prehistoric placental mammals
Rupelian first appearances
Fossil taxa described in 1959
Taxa named by Roy Herbert Reinhart